Liisa Tuomi (1924–1989) was a Finnish stage, film and television actress.

Selected filmography
 North Express (1947)

References

Bibliography 
 Qvist, Per Olov & von Bagh, Peter. Guide to the Cinema of Sweden and Finland. Greenwood Publishing Group, 2000.

External links 
 

1924 births
1989 deaths
Finnish stage actresses
Finnish film actresses
Actors from Vyborg